Les Wiggins is a British-American sound editor. He won four British Academy Film Awards and was nominated four more in the category Best Sound.

Selected filmography 
 Fiddler on the Roof (1971; co-nominated with David Hildyard and Gordon McCallum)
 Jesus Christ Superstar (1973; co-won with Gordon McCallum and Keith Grant)
 Rollerball (1975; co-nominated with Archie Ludski, Derek Ball and Gordon McCallum)
 Bugsy Malone (1976; co-won with Clive Winter and Ken Barker)
 A Bridge Too Far (1977; co-won with Peter Horrocks, Gerry Humphreys, Simon Haye and Robin O'Donoghue)
 Fame (1980; co-won with Chris Newman and Michael J. Kohut)
 Greystoke: The Legend of Tarzan, Lord of the Apes (1984, co-nominated with Ivan Sharrock, Gordon McCallum and Roy Baker)
 The Last Emperor (1988; co-nominated with Ivan Sharrock and Bill Rowe)

References

External links 

Living people
Place of birth missing (living people)
Year of birth missing (living people)
American sound editors
British sound editors
British emigrants to the United States
Best Sound BAFTA Award winners